David Keith Williams (born April 21, 1972) is a former Major League Baseball player for the San Francisco Giants during the 1996 season. He was drafted in the 7th round of the 1993 amateur draft.

Minor leagues

Williams had a career .291 batting average in the minor leagues and 117 home runs over 8 seasons. His overall minor league OPS was .853. He was called up to the majors in 1996, but his best season in the minors was 1997, where he hit .320 with 22 home runs for the Giants AA team.

Major leagues

Williams had his major league debut on June 7, 1996, going 0 for 1. His final game was on June 23, 1996. Overall, he went 5 for 20 with 6 strikeouts. All five of his hits were singles, and he did not score or drive in a single run. Defensively, he did not make a single error in 4 games played.

External links

Pura Pelota (Venezuelan Winter League)

1972 births
Living people
Altoona Curve players
Baseball players from Pennsylvania
Clemson Tigers baseball players
Everett Giants players
Fresno Grizzlies players
Major League Baseball outfielders
Pastora de Occidente players
People from Bedford, Pennsylvania
Phoenix Firebirds players
San Francisco Giants players
San Jose Giants players
Shreveport Captains players
St. Paul Saints players
American expatriate baseball players in Venezuela